The men's discus throw event at the 2004 African Championships in Athletics was held in Brazzaville, Republic of the Congo on July 14.

Results

References
Results

2004 African Championships in Athletics
Discus throw at the African Championships in Athletics